The Hon. Philip Sherard (17 November 1623 – 1695) was an English soldier, landowner and politician who sat in the House of Commons  from 1660 to 1685.

Early life
Sherard was born on 17 November 1623 as the younger son of William Sherard, 1st Baron Sherard (1588–1640) and his wife Abigail Cave (1593–1659). His older brother was Bennet Sherard, 2nd Baron Sherard, who sat as MP for Leicestershire and served as Lord Lieutenant of Rutland. His nephew was Bennet Sherard, 1st Earl of Harborough.  His mother, the widow of Henry Tresham (with whom she had several sons), was a daughter of Cecil Cave and Anne (née Bennett) Cave.

He was a student at St John's College, Oxford in 1639, and travelled abroad in Italy in 1641.

Career
Sherard went abroad with his brother shortly before the Civil War, where he became a captain in the Dutch army. He enjoyed field sports and settled at the family estate of Whissendine, Rutland, holding no local office until the Restoration.

In 1660, Sherard was elected Member of Parliament for Rutland in the Convention Parliament. He was one of those proposed as Knight of the Royal Oak, and his estate had a yearly income of £600. In 1661, he was re-elected MP for Rutland in the Cavalier parliament, probably without a contest. He was re-elected in the two elections for the First and Second Exclusion Parliaments and again in 1681.

In 1682, he was removed from local office, and took no further part in politics, his son Bennet replacing him as knight of the shire in the Convention.

Personal life
In 1645, Sherard was married to Margaret Eure, widow of both John Pulteney of Misterton, Leicestershire and a Cavalier Col. Hon. William Eure of Old Malton (son of Lord Eure), and daughter of Sir Thomas Denton of Hillesden, Buckinghamshire. Margaret converted to Protestantism. Together, they were the parents of three sons and one daughter, including:

 Bennet Sherard (1649–1701), who was also MP for Rutland.
 Philip Sherard, who married and had issue.
 Denton Sherard.
 Abigail Sherard (b. 1652), who married John Pickering, Esq. (1654–1703) and had issue.

Sherard died at the age of 71 and was buried at Whissendine on 4 March 1695.

Descendants
Through his son Bennet, he was a grandfather of Philip Sherard, 2nd Earl of Harborough (–1750), who inherited the Harborough earldom through special remainder,  and Margaret Sherard, the wife of The Most Rev. John Gilbert, Archbishop of York.

References

1623 births
1695 deaths
Philip
Younger sons of barons
People from Whissendine
Place of birth missing
English MPs 1660
English MPs 1661–1679
English MPs 1679
English MPs 1680–1681
English MPs 1681